A Seaside Parish is a British television documentary made by Tiger Aspect Productions for BBC Two which was first broadcast in 2003. Following the success of A Country Parish, the programme concerns the life of a new incumbent (known as the Rector) and general parish life in the village of Boscastle and the adjoining district, a picturesque but isolated community in North Cornwall.

The Rev Christine Musser and her American husband arrived in Boscastle at the start of that year when she was appointed Priest-in-Charge of Boscastle with Davidstow. The programme was also filmed during the Boscastle flood of 2004.

The Boscastle Group has within it six parishes and seven churches, six of which are Grade II listed buildings. The Rector of Boscastle is responsible for seven churches in the village and surrounding district: Forrabury (St Symphorian), Minster (St Merthiana), St. Juliot, Lesnewth (St Michael and All Angels), Trevalga (St Petroc), Otterham (St Denis) and Davidstow (St David).

The programme was followed by the series An Island Parish in 2007, which focused on the clergy and parishioners of the Isles of Scilly.

References

External links

 
Seaside priest is TV star 
Musser leaves Boscastle

BBC television documentaries
Television series about Christianity
2003 British television series debuts
2006 British television series endings
2000s British documentary television series
Mass media in Cornwall
Christianity in Cornwall
English-language television shows